Arsenate reductase (glutaredoxin) is an enzyme that catalyzes the chemical reaction

arsenate + glutaredoxin  arsenite + glutaredoxin disulfide + H2O

Thus, the two substrates of this enzyme are arsenate and glutaredoxin, whereas its 3 products are arsenite, glutaredoxin disulfide, and water.

This enzyme belongs to the family of oxidoreductases, specifically those acting on phosphorus or arsenic in donor with disulfide as acceptor.  The systematic name of this enzyme class is glutaredoxin:arsenate oxidoreductase.

Structural studies

References

 
 
 
 
 
 
 
 
 
 

EC 1.20.4
Enzymes of known structure